Cipango may refer to:
 Cipan Guó, a name of Japan
 Cipango (sip server), a Java-based Sip Servlets server